Regeneration is Christian rock band Superchick's first remix album. It was released on October 21, 2003.  "Me Against the World", featured on the soundtrack for Legally Blonde 2, is the only non-remix song on the record.  "One Girl Revolution (Battle Mix)" also appeared on Beauty From Pain 1.1.

Track listing
 "One Girl Revolution (Battle Mix)"
 "Get Up (Heelside Mix)"
 "Me Against the World"
 "Barlow Girls (Space Monkey Lab Mix)"
 "Stand Up (Mob Action Mix)"
 "I Belong to You (Midnight Mix)"
 "Princes and Frogs (Underdog Mix)"
 "One and Lonely (The Beatmart Mix)"
 "Hero (Red Pill Mix)"

References

Superchick albums
2003 remix albums
Inpop Records remix albums